Martin Bočko (born 22 April 1991) is a Slovak left defender and left midfielder player who currently plays for Spartak Trnava Juniori.

References
https://archive.today/20130418175042/http://www.spartak.sk/fcst.php?Youth&Team=BM&Personal=123&season=2012/2013

1991 births
Living people
Slovak footballers

Association football fullbacks
Association football midfielders
TJ OFC Gabčíkovo players
Sportspeople from Trnava